

Africa

 

Algeria
 Algiers: Museum of Modern Art of Algiers, Museum of Popular Arts and Traditions, National Museum of Fine Arts of Algiers
 Oran: Ahmed Zabana National Museum

Egypt
 Cairo: Egyptian Museum, Museum of Islamic Art, Gezira Center for Modern Art, Museum of Islamic Ceramics, Prince Amr Ibrahim Palace, The Townhouse Gallery, Mohamed Mahmoud Khalil Museum, Darb 1718
 Port Said: Museum of Modern Art in Egypt

Ivory Coast
 Abidjan: Musée Municipal d'Art Contemporain de Cocody

Madagascar
 Antananarivo: University of Madagascar's Museum of Art and Archaeology

Morocco
 Tangier: Museum of Contemporary Art (Tangier), Musée de Carmen-Macein, Dar el Makhzen (Tangier)

Namibia
 Windhoek: National Art Gallery of Namibia

Nigeria
 Lagos: National Gallery of Art
 Lagos: National Gallery of Modern Art 
 Oshogbo: Uli Beier Museum

Rwanda
 Nyanza: Rwesero Art Museum

Senegal
 Dakar: IFAN Museum of African Arts

South Africa
 Cape Town: South African National Gallery
 Johannesburg: MuseuMAfricA, Johannesburg Art Gallery, No Show Museum
 Kimberley: William Humphreys Art Gallery
 Nieu-Bethesda: The Owl House
 Port Elizabeth: Nelson Mandela Metropolitan Art Museum
 Pretoria: Pretoria Art Museum, Edoardo Villa Museum, Van Tilburg Collection, Van Wouw Museum

Tunisia
 Kairouan: Raqqada

Zimbabwe
 Harare: National Gallery of Zimbabwe

Asia
Bangladesh
 Dhaka: Zainul Gallery, National Art Gallery (Bangladesh)

China
 Beijing: Palace Museum, Guanfu Museum, National Art Museum of China, Today Art Museum, Beijing Art Museum, Beijing World Art Museum, Pékin Fine Arts, Capital Museum
 Hangzhou: Zhejiang Provincial Museum
 Nanjing: Nanjing 4Cube Museum of Contemporary Art, Jiangsu Provincial Art Museum
 Shanghai: Shanghai Museum, Shanghai Art Museum, Museum of Contemporary Art Shanghai, Rockbund Art Museum, Long Museum, China Art Museum, Power Station of Art
 Suzhou: Suzhou Museum
 Zhengzhou: Henan Museum

Hong Kong
 City of Victoria: University Museum and Art Gallery, Hong Kong Visual Arts Centre, Tsui Museum of Art
 Kowloon: Hong Kong Museum of Art, M+

India
 Ahmedabad: Lalbhai Dalpatbhai Museum, Sanskar Kendra
 Allahabad: Allahabad Museum
 Bangalore: National Gallery of Modern Art, Bangalore
 Bangalore: Museum of Art & Photography (MAP)
 Bhopal: Bharat Bhavan
 Bhubaneswar: Odisha State Museum
 Chandigarh: Government Museum and Art Gallery, Chandigarh
 Chennai: Government Museum, Chennai, The National Art Gallery (Chennai)
 Hyderabad: Salar Jung Museum
 Jaipur: Albert Hall Museum, Jawahar Kala Kendra
 Kolkata: Asutosh Museum of Indian Art, Indian Museum, Victoria Memorial (India)
 Mumbai: Cowasji Jehangir Hall, Jehangir Art Gallery, National Gallery of Modern Art, Mumbai, Prince of Wales Museum
 New Delhi: National Gallery of Modern Art, National Museum, Sanskriti Museums, Triveni Kala Sangam, Talwar Gallery
 Panjim: Goa State Museum
 Patna: Patna Museum, Jalan Museum, Bhartiya Nritya Kala Mandir
 Thiruvananthapuram: Sree Chitra Art Gallery, Napier Museum
 Vadodara: Baroda Museum & Picture Gallery, Maharaja Fateh Singh Museum

Indonesia
 Jakarta: National Museum of Indonesia, Fine Art and Ceramic Museum, National Gallery of Indonesia

Iran
 Tehran: National Museum of Iran, Tehran Museum of Contemporary Art, Carpet Museum of Iran

Iraq
 Baghdad: National Museum of Iraq

Israel
 Haifa: Haifa Museum of Art, Hecht Museum, Janco Dada Museum, Mane-Katx Museum, Tikotin Museum of Japanese Art
 Jerusalem: Bible Lands Museum, Israel Museum, Jerusalem Artists House, L. A. Mayer Institute for Islamic Art, Rockefeller Museum
 Tel Aviv: Bauhaus Center, Tel Aviv Museum of Art, Design Museum Holon

Japan
 Atami: MOA Museum of Art
 Kanazawa: 21st Century Museum of Contemporary Art
 Kyoto: Kyoto National Museum, Kyoto Municipal Museum of Art, National Museum of Modern Art Kyoto, Sen-oku Hakuko Kan, Miho Museum
 Matsumoto: Japan Ukiyo-e Museum
 Nara: Nara National Museum
 Naruto: Ōtsuka Museum of Art
 Osaka: Osaka National Museum of Art
 Tokyo: Bridgestone Museum of Art, Hatakeyama Memorial Museum of Fine Art Idemitsu Museum of Arts, Koishikawa Ukiyo-e Art Museum, Mitsui Memorial Museum, Mitsubishi Ichigokan Museum, Mori Art Museum, Museum of Contemporary Art Tokyo, Museum of the Imperial Collections, National Art Center, National Museum of Modern Art, Tokyo, National Museum of Western Art, New Otani Art Museum, Nezu Museum, Ota Memorial Museum of Art, Setagaya Art Museum, Suntory Museum of Art, Tokyo Metropolitan Art Museum, Tokyo National Museum, Tokyo Fuji Art Museum, Watari Museum of Contemporary Art

Jordan
 Amman: Jordan National Gallery of Fine Arts

Lebanon
 Beirut: Sursock Museum

Malaysia
 Kuala Lumpur: Islamic Arts Museum Malaysia, National Visual Arts Gallery (Malaysia), Petronas Gallery

Mongolia
 Ulaanbaatar: Mongolian National Modern Art Gallery

Nepal
Kathmandu: Patan Museum, Children's Art Museum of Nepal

North Korea

 Pyongyang: Korean Art Gallery

Pakistan
 Islamabad: National Art Gallery

Philippines
 Manila: National Museum of Fine Arts

Singapore'
 Singapore: 8Q SAM, Singapore Art Museum, National Museum of Singapore, National Gallery Singapore, NUS Museum, ArtScience Museum, Nei Xue Tang Museum, Singapore City Gallery

South Korea
 Daejeon: Daejeon Museum of Art
 Gwacheon: Jebiwool Art Museum, National Museum of Contemporary Art (South Korea)
 Seoul: National Museum of Korea, Bukchon Art Museum, Hanwon Museum of Art, Kumho Museum of Art, Leeum, Samsung Museum of Art, Milal Museum of Art, Posco Art Museum, Total Museum of Contemporary Art, Seoul Museum of Art, Seoul National University Museum of Art, Seonbawi Museum of Art, Sungkok Art Museum, Artsonje Center, Horim Museum, Hwajeong Museum, Ilmin Museum of Art, Museum of Korean Buddhist Art, Whanki Museum, SOMA Museum of Art, Savina Museum, Rodin Gallery
 Yongin: Ho-am Art Museum

Syria
 Aleppo: National Museum of Aleppo
 Damascus: National Museum of Damascus

Taiwan
 Changhua: Changhua Arts Museum, Changhua County Art Museum, Lukang Folk Arts Museum
 Chiayi City: Chiayi Art Museum
 Chiayi County: Mei-Ling Fine Arts Museum
 Kaohsiung: Kaohsiung Museum of Fine Arts
 Keelung: YM Oceanic Culture and Art Museum
 Nantou: Yu-hsiu Museum of Art
 Pingtung: Pingtung Art Museum
 Taichung: Asia Museum of Modern Art, Fengyuan Museum of Lacquer Art, National Taiwan Museum of Fine Arts, Taichung English and Art Museum
 Tainan: Fangyuan Museum of Arts, Tainan Art Museum
 Taipei: Aurora Art Museum, Children's Art Museum in Taipei, Jut Art Museum, Kuandu Museum of Fine Arts, Lingnan Fine Arts Museum, Museum of Contemporary Art Taipei, Museum of Jade Art, National Palace Museum, Taipei Fine Arts Museum, Tittot Glass Art Museum
 Taitung: Taitung Art Museum
 Taoyuan: Daxi Wood Art Ecomuseum
 Yilan: Yilan Museum of Art

Thailand
 Bangkok: Bangkok Art and Culture Centre, Bangkok University Gallery, Bangkok National Museum, H Gallery, Jamjuree Art Gallery, Silpakorn University Art Gallery, National Gallery of Thailand, Suan Dusit Art Gallery, Span's Cultural Gallery, Museum of Buddhist Art, Thavibu Gallery

Turkmenistan
Ashgabat: Turkmen Museum of Fine Arts, Turkmen Carpet Museum

United Arab Emirates
 Abu Dhabi: Salwa Zeidan Gallery, Guggenheim Abu Dhabi, Louvre Abu Dhabi, Zayed National Museum
 Al Ain: Sheikh Zayed Palace Museum
 Dubai: Salsali Private Museum, Tashkeel Art Hub, 
 Sharjah: Sharjah Art Museum

Uzbekistan
 Nukus: Nukus Museum of Art

Vietnam
 Hanoi: Hanoi Contemporary Arts Centre, Vietnam National Museum of Fine Arts
 Huế: Hue Museum of Royal Fine Arts

Europe

Albania
 Tirana: National Art Gallery of Albania

Armenia
 Yerevan: Cafesjian Museum of Art, National Gallery of Armenia

Austria
 Graz: Universalmuseum Joanneum
 Klagenfurt: Museum Moderner Kunst Kaernten
 Klosterneuburg: Essl Museum
 Linz: Lentos Art Museum
 Neuhaus, Kärnten: Museum Liaunig
 Salzburg: Residenzgalerie, Museum der Moderne Salzburg
 Vienna: Kunsthistorisches Museum, Leopold Museum, Albertina, Österreichische Galerie Belvedere, MUMOK, Liechtenstein Museum, Museum für angewandte Kunst, Gemäldegalerie der Akademie der bildenden Künste

Azerbaijan
 Baku: National Art Museum of Azerbaijan, Baku Museum of Modern Art

Belgium
 Antwerp: Royal Museum of Fine Arts, Museum Mayer van den Bergh, Rubenshuis, Museum of Modern Art Antwerp (MuHKA)
 Bruges: Groeningemuseum, Old St John’s Hospital
 Brussels: Royal Museums of Fine Arts of Belgium, Cinquantenaire Museum, Horta Museum
 Ghent: Museum of Fine Arts
 Kruishoutem: SONS Museum
 Tournai: Musée des Beaux-Arts Tournai

Bulgaria
 Sofia: National Gallery for Foreign Art, National Archaeological Museum, National Art Gallery
 Varna: Varna Archaeological Museum

Croatia
 Split: Gallery of Fine Arts, Ivan Meštrović Gallery
 Zagreb: Art Pavilion, Gliptoteka, Klovićevi dvori, Mimara Museum, Modern Gallery, Zagreb, Museum of Contemporary Art, Zagreb, People and Art House Lauba

Czech Republic
 Nelahozeves: Lobkowicz collection in the Castle (Zamek Nelahozeves)
 Prague: National Gallery, Náprstek Museum, Prague Castle Galleries, Rudolfinum Gallery, Museum of Decorative Arts in Prague

Denmark
 Aarhus: ARoS Aarhus Kunstmuseum, Moesgaard Museum
 Copenhagen: Arken Museum of Modern Art, Ny Carlsberg Glyptotek, Statens Museum for Kunst, Thorvaldsens Museum
 Humlebæk: Louisiana Museum of Modern Art
 Nivå: Nivaagaards Malerisamling
 Randers: Randers Museum of Art

Estonia
 Tallinn: Kumu Art Museum, Kadriorg Art Museum, Mikkel Museum, Niguliste Museum, Adamson-Eric Museum
 Tartu: University of Tartu Art Museum, Tartu Art Museum

Finland
 Helsinki: Ateneum Art Museum, Museum of Contemporary Art Kiasma, Amos Rex, Helsinki Art Museum

France
 Aix-en-Provence: Musée Granet
 Ajaccio: Musée Fesch
 Amiens: Musée de Picardie
 Arles: Musée de l'Arles et de la Provence antiques
 Avignon: Musée du Petit Palais, Fondation Calvet, Musée Angladon
 Besançon: Musée des Beaux-Arts et d'archéologie
 Bordeaux: Musée des Beaux-Arts de Bordeaux
 Caen: Musée des Beaux-Arts
 Chantilly: Musée Condé
 Colmar: Unterlinden Museum
 Dijon: Musée des Beaux-Arts
 Dole: Musée des Beaux-Arts
 Écouen: Musée national de la Renaissance
 Épinal: Musée départemental d'Art ancien et contemporain
 Grenoble: Museum of Grenoble
 Le Cateau-Cambrésis: Musée départemental Henri Matisse
 Le Havre: Musée des Beaux-Arts André Malraux
 Lens: Louvre-Lens
 Lille: Palais des Beaux-Arts
 Limoges: Musée des Beaux-Arts
 Lyon: Musée des Beaux-Arts
 Marseille: Musée Grobet-Labadié
 Metz: Centre Pompidou-Metz; The Golden Courtyard Museums
 Montauban: Musée Ingres
 Montpellier: Musée Fabre
 Montsoreau: Château de Montsoreau-Museum of Contemporary Art, Château de Montsoreau
 Nancy: Musée des Beaux-Arts, Musée de l'École de Nancy, Musée Lorrain
 Nantes: Musée des Beaux-Arts
 Nice: Musée des Beaux-Arts de Nice, Musée Matisse, Musée d'art moderne et d'art contemporain, Musée des Arts Asiatiques
 Nîmes: Musée des Beaux-Arts
 Paris: Musée du Louvre, Musée d'Orsay, Musée Rodin, Centre Pompidou, Musée Picasso, Guimet Museum, Musée Marmottan Monet, Musée de Cluny, Musée de l'Orangerie, Musée des Arts Décoratifs, Musée Jacquemart-André, Musée du quai Branly, Petit Palais, Musée d'Art Moderne de la Ville de Paris, Musée Gustave Moreau, Musée Delacroix, Musée Nissim de Camondo, Musée Cognacq-Jay, Musée Maillol, Musée d'Art et d'Histoire du Judaïsme, Musée Carnavalet
 Poitiers: Musée Sainte-Croix
 Reims: Musée des Beaux-Arts
 Rennes: Musée des Beaux-Arts
 Rouen: Musée des Beaux-Arts
 Saint-Germain-en-Laye: National Archaeological Museum
 Saint-Paul, Alpes-Maritimes: Fondation Maeght
 Strasbourg: Musée de l’Œuvre Notre-Dame, Musée des Beaux-Arts, Musée d'art moderne et contemporain, Musée des Arts décoratifs
 Toulouse: Musée des Augustins, Fondation Bemberg
 Tours: Musée des Beaux-Arts
 Troyes: Musée des Beaux-Arts, Musée d'art moderne
 Villeneuve-d'Ascq: Lille Métropole Museum of Modern, Contemporary and Outsider Art

Germany
 Augsburg: Kunstsammlungen und Museen Augsburg
 Berlin: Bauhaus Archive, Pergamonmuseum, Bodemuseum, Altes Museum, Neues Museum, Alte Nationalgalerie, Gemäldegalerie, Neue Nationalgalerie, Museum Berggruen, Kunstgewerbemuseum, Museum of Asian Art, Museum of Islamic Art, Scharf-Gerstenberg Collection, Brücke Museum, Friedrichswerder Church, Berlinische Galerie, Bröhan Museum, Märkisches Museum, Jewish Museum Berlin
 Bielefeld: Kunsthalle Bielefeld
 Bonn: Kunstmuseum Bonn, Rheinisches Landesmuseum Bonn
 Braunschweig: Herzog Anton Ulrich Museum
 Bremen: Kunsthalle, Paula Modersohn-Becker Museum
 Chemnitz: Museum Gunzenhauser
 Cologne: Museum Ludwig, Wallraf-Richartz Museum, Romano-Germanic Museum, Schnütgen Museum, Käthe Kollwitz Museum, Museum für Angewandte Kunst (Cologne)
 Darmstadt: Hessisches Landesmuseum Darmstadt
 Donaueschingen: Museum Art.Plus
 Dresden: Gemäldegalerie Alte Meister, Grünes Gewölbe, Galerie Neue Meister
 Düsseldorf: Kunstsammlung Nordrhein-Westfalen, museum Kunst Palast
 Duisburg: Lehmbruck Museum, Museum Küppersmühle
 Erfurt: Angermuseum
 Essen: Museum Folkwang
 Frankfurt: Städel, Museum für angewandte Kunst, Museum für Moderne Kunst, Museum Giersch, Liebieghaus
 Freiburg im Breisgau: Augustiner Museum
 Halle, Saxony-Anhalt: Stiftung Moritzburg / Kunstmuseum des Landes Sachsen-Anhalt
 Hamburg: Kunsthalle
 Hanover: Sprengel Museum, Lower Saxony State Museum, Kestner-Museum
 Heidelberg: Kurpfälzisches Museum
 Karlsruhe: Staatliche Kunsthalle Karlsruhe, Center for Art and Media Karlsruhe
 Kassel: Schloss Wilhelmshöhe
 Leipzig: Museum der bildenden Künste, Museum für angewandte Kunst
 Mainz: Landesmuseum Mainz
 Mannheim: Kunsthalle
 Mönchengladbach: Abteiberg Museum
 Munich: Alte Pinakothek, Neue Pinakothek, Pinakothek der Moderne, Lenbachhaus, Glyptothek, Staatliche Antikensammlungen, Museum Brandhorst, Villa Stuck, Die Neue Sammlung
 Münster: Kunstmuseum Pablo Picasso Münster, Westphalian State Museum of Art and Cultural History
 Nuremberg: Germanisches Nationalmuseum, Neues Museum Nürnberg
 Osnabrück: Felix Nussbaum Haus
 Potsdam: Sanssouci Picture Gallery
 Saarbrücken: Saarland Museum
 Schwerin: Staatliches Museum
 Stuttgart: Staatsgalerie, Neue Staatsgalerie, Kunstmuseum
 Weimar: Klassik Stiftung Weimar, New Bauhaus Museum
 Wuppertal: Von der Heydt Museum

Greece
 Athens: National Archaeological Museum of Athens, New Acropolis Museum, Benaki Museum, Museum of Cycladic Art, Vorres Museum
 Delos: Archaeological Museum of Delos
 Delphi: Delphi Archaeological Museum
 Heraklion: Heraklion Archaeological Museum
 Komotini: Archaeological Museum of Komotini
 Olympia, Greece: Archaeological Museum of Olympia
 Rhodes: Archaeological Museum of Rhodes
 Santorini: Archaeological Museum of Thera
 Santorini: Museum of Prehistoric Thera
 Thessaloniki: Archaeological Museum of Thessaloniki

Hungary
 Budapest: Museum of Fine Arts, Museum of Applied Arts, Hungarian National Gallery, Zelnik István Southeast Asian Gold Museum

Iceland
 Reykjavík: Reykjavík Art Museum

Ireland
 Dublin: Hugh Lane Municipal Gallery, Irish Museum of Modern Art, National Gallery of Ireland

Italy
Aosta: Regional Archaeological Museum of Aosta Valley, Museum of the Cathedral's Treasure
Arezzo: Museo statale d'arte medievale e moderna
 Bacoli: Archaeological Museum of the Campi Flegrei
 Bari: Pinacoteca Provinciale di Bari
 Bergamo: Accademia Carrara
 Bologna: Pinacoteca Nazionale di Bologna, Bologna Museum of Modern Art, Museo Civico Medievale
 Bolzano: South Tyrol Museum of Archaeology
 Brescia: Pinacoteca Tosio Martinengo
 Brixen: Diocesan Museum
 Cesena: Malatestiana Library, Pinacoteca Comunale di Cesena
 Ferrara: Pinacoteca Nazionale, Palazzo Schifanoia, Cathedral Museum, National Archaeological Museum of Ferrara
 Florence: Uffizi Gallery, Fine Arts Academy, Palazzo Pitti, Bargello, Museo Nazionale di San Marco, Archaeological Museum of Florence
 Foggia: Civi Museum and Pinacoteca Comunale
 Forlì: Pinacoteca Civica di Forlì
 Genoa: Musei di Strada Nuova, Diocesan Museum, Museum of Genoa Cathedral's Treasure, Doge's Genoa, Palazzo Reale
 Livorno: Museo Civico Giovanni Fattori
 Mantua: Palazzo Ducale, Palazzo Te
 Messina: Museo Regionale
 Milan: Castello Sforzesco, Pinacoteca di Brera, Pinacoteca Ambrosiana, Museo Poldi Pezzoli, Museo del Novecento, Civico museo d'arte contemporanea, Padiglione d'Arte Contemporanea
 Modena: Galleria Estense
 Naples: Museo di Capodimonte, Naples National Archaeological Museum, Caserta Palace
 Palermo: Museo archeologico regionale Antonio Salinas, Palazzo Abatellis
 Parma: Galleria Nazionale di Parma, Palazzo della Pilotta
 Parma: Museo archeologico nazionale di Parma, Pinacoteca Stuard
 Perugia: Galleria Nazionale dell'Umbria
Piacenza: Galleria d'Arte Moderna "Ricci Oddi", Civic Museums of Palazzo Farnese
 Piombino: Archaeological Museum of Populonia
 Pisa: Museo dell'Opera del Duomo, Camposanto Monumentale, Pisa Charterhouse
 Prato: Civic Museum, Museo dell'Opera del Duomo, Gallery of Palazzo degli Alberti
 Reggello: Museo Masaccio
 Reggio Calabria: Museo Nazionale della Magna Grecia
 Rome: Galleria Borghese, National Museum of Rome, Palazzo Barberini, Palazzo delle Esposizioni, Capitoline Museums, National Etruscan Museum, Doria Pamphilj Gallery, Galleria Colonna, Galleria Spada, Museum of Roman Civilization, Galleria Nazionale d'Arte Antica, Galleria Nazionale d'Arte Moderna, Museum of Contemporary Art of Rome, MAXXI – National Museum of the 21st Century Arts
 Sansepolcro: Pinacoteca Comunale
 Siena: Museo archeologico nazionale di Siena, Museo dell'Opera Metropolitana del Duomo, Pinacoteca Nazionale, Museo Civico inside Palazzo Pubblico
 Syracuse, Sicily: Archaeological Museum
 Trento: Buonconsiglio Castle, Museum of Modern and Contemporary Art of Trento and Rovereto, Diocesan Museum
 Turin: Museo Egizio, Museum of Ancient Art, Pinacoteca Giovanni e Marella Agnelli, Galleria Sabauda
 Urbino:Galleria Nazionale delle Marche
 Vatican City: Vatican Museums
 Venice: Gallerie dell'Accademia, Peggy Guggenheim Collection, Museo Correr, Museo Fortuny, Ca' Rezzonico, Ca' d'Oro, Ca' Pesaro, Palazzo Grimani, Punta della Dogana
 Verona: Castelvecchio Museum
 Volterra: Museo diocesano di arte sacra, Pinacoteca e museo civico, Museo etrusco Guarnacci

Liechtenstein
 Vaduz: Kunstmuseum Liechtenstein

Luxembourg
 Luxembourg City: Mudam, National Museum of History and Art

Netherlands
 Amstelveen: Cobra Museum
 Amsterdam: Hermitage Amsterdam, Rijksmuseum Amsterdam, Stedelijk Museum, Van Gogh Museum
 Eindhoven: Van Abbemuseum
 Enschede: Rijksmuseum Twenthe
 Groningen: Groninger Museum
 Haarlem: Frans Hals Museum
 Laren, North Holland: Singer Laren
 Leerdam: Hofje van Mevrouw Van Aerden
 Leiden: Rijksmuseum van Oudheden, Stedelijk Museum De Lakenhal
 Maastricht: Bonnefanten Museum
 Otterlo: Kröller-Müller Museum
 Rotterdam: Museum Boijmans Van Beuningen, Kunsthal
 The Hague: Mauritshuis, Museum Bredius, Gemeentemuseum
 Utrecht: Centraal Museum, Museum Catharijneconvent

Norway
 Bærum: Henie-Onstad Art Centre
 Oslo: National Museum of Art, Architecture and Design, Munch Museum

Poland
 Bielsko-Biała: Bielsko-Biała Museum and Castle
 Bydgoszcz: Leon Wyczółkowski Regional Museum
 Gdańsk: Muzeum Narodowe
 Katowice: Silesian Museum
 Kielce: National Museum of Kielce
 Kozłówka: Museum of the Zamoyski Family
 Kraków: Czartoryski Museum, National Museum, Kraków, Sukiennice Museum, MOCAK Museum of Contemporary Art, Wawel Royal Castle National Art Collection, EUROPEUM – European Culture Centre
 Lublin: National Museum, Lublin
 Łódź: Museum of Art in Łódź
 Poznań: National Museum, Poznań
 Pszczyna: Castle Museum of Pszczyna
 Siedlce: Diocesan Museum in Siedlce
 Szczecin: National Museum
 Toruń: District Museum in Toruń
 Warsaw: National Museum, Ujazdów Centre for Contemporary Art, Zachęta National Gallery of Art, King John III Palace Museum, Lanckoroński Collection in the Royal Castle, Academy of Fine Arts Museum inside Czapski Palace, Porczyński Gallery, Lazienki Palace Museum
 Wrocław: National Museum, Wrocław

Portugal
 Lisbon: Museu Nacional de Arte Antiga, Museu Calouste Gulbenkian, Museu Colecção Berardo
 Porto: Serralves

Romania
 Bucharest: National Museum of Art of Romania, The Art Collections Museum, National Museum of Contemporary Art, K.H. Zambaccian Museum, Theodor Pallady Museum, George Severeanu Museum, Frederic and Cecilia Cuțescu-Storck Art Museum
 Craiova: Art Museum
 Iaşi: Art Museum
 Ploiești: Ploiești Art Museum
 Sibiu: Brukenthal National Museum
 Timişoara: Timisoara Art Museum
 Tulcea: Tulcea Art Museum

Russia
 Moscow: State Tretyakov Gallery, Pushkin Museum, Kremlin Armoury, Moscow Museum of Modern Art, Moscow House of Photography, State Historical Museum
 St. Petersburg: Hermitage, Russian Museum
 Saratov: Radischev Art Museum
 Taganrog: Taganrog Museum of Art

Serbia
 Belgrade: Belgrade City Museum, White Palace, National Museum of Serbia, Museum of Contemporary Art
 Novi Sad: The Gallery of Fine Arts – Gift Collection of Rajko Mamuzić, Galery of Matica Srpska, Pavle Beljanski Memorial Collection, Museum of Vojvodina 

Slovenia

 Ljubljana: Museum of Modern Art
 Kostanjevica na Krki: Božidar Jakac Art Museum
 Slovenj Gradec: Museum of Modern and Contemporary Art Koroška

Spain

 Alcalá de Henares: Museo de Escultura al Aire Libre de Alcalá de Henares
 Barcelona: Museu Nacional d'Art de Catalunya, Museu Picasso, Fundació Joan Miró, Fundació Antoni Tàpies, Barcelona Museum of Contemporary Art
 Bilbao: Guggenheim Museum, Bilbao Fine Arts Museum
 Cádiz: Museo de Cádiz
 Córdoba, Spain: Museo Arqueológico y Etnológico de Córdoba
 Figueres: Dalí Theatre and Museum
 Granada: Sacristy Museum (Sacristía-Museo) of the Royal Chapel of Granada
 Madrid: Museo del Prado, Museo Reina Sofia, Museo Thyssen Bornemisza, National Archaeological Museum of Spain, Museo Sorolla, Museo Lázaro Galdiano, Museo Cerralbo, Real Academia de Bellas Artes de San Fernando, Museum of the Americas, Royal Palace
 Málaga: Museo Picasso Málaga
 San Lorenzo de El Escorial: El Escorial
 Seville: Museum of Fine Arts, Museo Arqueológico de Sevilla
 Toledo: Casa y Museo El Greco, Sacristy of Toledo Cathedral
 Valencia: Museu de Belles Arts de València
 Valladolid: Museum of Sculpture

Sweden
 Gothenburg: Gothenburg Museum of Art
 Mariefred: National Portrait Gallery
 Stockholm: Nationalmuseum, Moderna Museet, Tensta Konsthall
 Halmstad: Mjellby konstmuseum

Switzerland
 Basel: Kunstmuseum, Museum of Contemporary Art, Museum Tinguely
 Bern: Kunstmuseum, Zentrum Paul Klee, Museum of Fine Arts
 Davos: Kirchner Museum
 Geneva: Fondation Baur, Musée d'Art et d'Histoire, Musée Rath, Barbier-Mueller Museum, Musée Ariana, MAMCO
La Chaux-de-Fonds: Musée des beaux-arts
 Lausanne: Collection de l'art brut, Cantonal Museum of Fine Arts, Musée de l'Élysée, Museum of Contemporary Design and Applied Arts
 Riehen: Beyeler Foundation
 Solothurn : Kunstmuseum Solothurn
 St. Moritz: Segantini Museum
 Thun: Kunstmuseum Thun
 Vevey : Musée Jenisch
 Winterthur: Museum Oskar Reinhart, Collection Oskar Reinhart Am Römerholz, Kunstmuseum Winterthur, Fotomuseum Winterthur
 Zurich: Kunsthaus, Foundation E.G. Bührle, Rietberg Museum, Centre Le Corbusier, Swiss National Museum

Turkey
 Ankara: Erimtan Archaeology and Arts Museum, Hacettepe Museum, State Art and Sculpture Museum, Gazi University Art and Sculpture Museum, Müze Evliyagil, Cer Modern, Ayaz Museum
 Avanos: Güray Müze
 Bayburt: Baksı Museum
 Bursa: Bursa Museum of Turkish and Islamic Art
 Edirne: Edirne Museum of Turkish and Islamic Art, Trakya University Contemporary Art and Sculpture Museum
 Erzurum: Yakutiye Medrese 
 Eskişehir: Anadolu University Contemporary Art Museum, Odunpazarı Modern Müze
 Istanbul: Pera Museum, Dogancay Museum, Sakıp Sabancı Museum, Topkapı Palace, Turkish and Islamic Arts Museum, Tiled Kiosk, Istanbul Museum of Modern Art, SantralIstanbul, Istanbul Contemporary Art Museum, Museum of Turkish Calligraphy Art, Proje4L / Elgiz Museum of Contemporary Art, Arter (art center), SALT (institution), Sadberk Hanım Museum, Rezan Has Museum, Perili Köşk, National Palaces Painting Museum, Istanbul Carpet Museum, Istanbul Museum of Graphic Arts, Istanbul Antrepo 5 Museum of Contemporary Art, Ara Güler Museum
 İzmir: İzmir Art and Sculpture Museum, Selçuk Yaşar Museum of Arts
 Konya: Ince Minaret Medrese, Karatay Medrese
 Kütahya: Kütahya Porcelain Museum, Kütahya Ceramic Museum
 Mersin: Mersin State Art and Sculpture Museum

Ukraine
 Kyiv: Museum of Western and Oriental Art
 Lviv: Lviv National Art Gallery
 Odessa: Odessa Museum of Western and Eastern Art

United Kingdom
 Barnard Castle: Bowes Museum
 Bath: Holburne Museum of Art
 Birmingham: Birmingham Museum & Art Gallery, Barber Institute of Fine Arts
 Bristol (UK): Royal West of England Academy, Bristol City Museum and Art Gallery
 Cambridge (UK): Fitzwilliam Museum, Kettle's Yard
 Cardiff: National Museum
 Coventry: Herbert Art Gallery and Museum
 Edinburgh: National Gallery of Scotland, Scottish National Gallery of Modern Art, Dean Gallery, Scottish National Portrait Gallery
 Glasgow: Gallery of Modern Art, Kelvingrove Art Gallery and Museum, Burrell Collection, Hunterian Art Gallery
 Leeds: Royal Armouries Museum, Temple Newsam, Leeds Art Gallery
 Liverpool: Walker Art Gallery, Tate Liverpool, Sudley House
 London: National Gallery, National Portrait Gallery, Tate Britain, Tate Modern, Victoria and Albert Museum, British Museum, Dulwich Picture Gallery, Saatchi Gallery, Courtauld Gallery, Royal Collection, Sir John Soane's Museum, Kenwood House, Wallace Collection, Apsley House, Foundling Museum, Guildhall Art Gallery, Leighton House Museum, Ranger's House (Wernher Collection), Hermitage Rooms, The Hayward, Two Temple Place
 Manchester: Manchester Art Gallery
 Margate: Turner Contemporary
 Oxford: Ashmolean Museum, Christ Church Picture Gallery
 St Ives: Tate St Ives
 Wakefield: Hepworth Gallery, Yorkshire Sculpture Park

Vatican City
 Vatican Museums

North America

Canada
 Baie-Saint-Paul, Quebec: Musée d'art contemporain de Baie-Saint-Paul
 Banff, Alberta: Walter Phillips Gallery
 Barrie, Ontario: MacLaren Art Centre
 Brampton, Ontario: Peel Art Gallery, Museum and Archives
 Burlington, Ontario: Art Gallery of Burlington
 Calgary, Alberta: Glenbow Museum
 Edmonton, Alberta: Art Gallery of Alberta
 Fredericton, New Brunswick: Beaverbrook Art Gallery
 Guelph, Ontario: Art Gallery of Guelph
 Halifax, Nova Scotia: Art Gallery of Nova Scotia
 Hamilton, Ontario: Arctic Experience McNaught Gallery, Art Gallery of Hamilton, McMaster Museum of Art
 Lethbridge, Alberta: Southern Alberta Art Gallery
 Kingston, Ontario: Agnes Etherington Art Centre
 Mississauga, Ontario: Art Gallery of Mississauga
 Montreal, Quebec: Musée d'art contemporain de Montréal, Montreal Museum of Fine Arts
 Niagara-on-the-Lake, Ontario: RiverBrink Art Museum
 Oshawa, Ontario: Robert McLaughlin Gallery
 Ottawa, Ontario: National Gallery of Canada, Ottawa Art Gallery, Portrait Gallery of Canada
 Peterborough, Ontario: Art Gallery of Peterborough
 Quebec City, Quebec: Musée national des beaux-arts du Québec
 Regina, Saskatchewan: MacKenzie Art Gallery
 Sackville, New Brunswick: Owens Art Gallery
 Saint John, New Brunswick: New Brunswick Museum
 Saskatoon, Saskatchewan: Remai Modern
 Sault Ste. Marie, Ontario: Art Gallery of Algoma
 Sherbrooke, Quebec: Sherbrooke Museum of Fine Arts
 St. John's, Newfoundland and Labrador: The Rooms
 Stratford, Ontario: Gallery Stratford
 Toronto, Ontario: Art Gallery of Ontario, Design Exchange, Gallery Arcturus, Gardiner Museum, Museum of Contemporary Art Toronto Canada, Royal Ontario Museum, Ryerson Image Centre
 Thunder Bay, Ontario: Thunder Bay Art Gallery
 Vancouver, British Columbia: Emily Carr House, Morris and Helen Belkin Art Gallery, Vancouver Art Gallery
 Vaughan, Ontario: McMichael Canadian Art Collection
 Victoria, British Columbia: Art Gallery of Greater Victoria, Maltwood Art Museum and Gallery
 Waterloo, Ontario: Canadian Clay and Glass Gallery
 Whitehorse: Yukon Arts Centre
 Windsor, Ontario: Art Gallery of Windsor
 Winnipeg, Manitoba: Ace Art inc., Blinkers, C2 Centre for Craft, Gallery 1C03, Gallery One One One, Leo Mol Gallery and Sculpture Garden, Manitoba Crafts Museum and Library, Martha Street Studio, Pavilion Gallery Museum, Platform Centre for Photographic + Digital Arts, Plug In Institute of Contemporary Art, Urban Shaman Contemporary Aboriginal Art, Winnipeg Art Gallery

Dominican Republic
 Santo Domingo: Museo Bellapart

Mexico

 Aguascalientes: Museo de Aguascalientes
 Cancún: Cancún Underwater Museum
 Mexico City: Palacio de Bellas Artes, Museo Nacional de Arte, Colección Júmex, Frida Kahlo Museum, Museo Mural Diego Rivera, Museo Dolores Olmedo, Museo Rufino Tamayo, Museo Soumaya, Museo de Arte Moderno, Palace of Iturbide, San Ildefonso College, José Luis Cuevas Museum, Centro Nacional de las Artes, Academy of San Carlos, Caricature Museum, Mexico City, Popular Art Museum, Mexico City, Franz Mayer Museum, Museo del Estanquillo, National Museum of Cultures, Centro Cultural Border (Mexico City), Centro Cultural de España, Galería de Arte Mexicano, Galería OMR, Museo de la Secretaría de Hacienda y Crédito Público, Museo Universitario Arte Contemporáneo, Museo de la Estampa, Museo Universitario del Chopo, Museo Carillo Gil
 Monterrey: Museo de Arte Contemporáneo de Monterrey, Museo del Palacio de Gobierno de Nuevo Leon

United States

Alabama
 Birmingham: Birmingham Museum of Art
 Huntsville: Huntsville Museum of Art
Mobile: Mobile Museum of Art
Montgomery: Montgomery Museum of Fine Arts

Alaska
 Anchorage: Anchorage Museum of Art and History

Arizona
 Phoenix: Phoenix Art Museum
 Tempe: ASU Art Museum
 Tucson: Tucson Museum of Art

Arkansas
 Bentonville: Crystal Bridges Museum of American Art
 Little Rock: Arkansas Arts Center

California
 Los Angeles: J. Paul Getty Museum, Hammer Museum, Los Angeles County Museum of Art, Museum of Contemporary Art, Los Angeles, The Broad
 Palm Springs: Palm Springs Art Museum
 Pasadena: Norton Simon Museum, Pacific Asia Museum
 Sacramento: Crocker Art Museum
 San Diego: Mingei International Museum, Museum of Contemporary Art San Diego, San Diego Museum of Art, Timken Museum of Art
 San Marino: Huntington Library
 San Francisco: San Francisco Museum of Modern Art, California Palace of the Legion of Honor, M. H. de Young Memorial Museum, Femina Potens Art Gallery, Asian Art Museum of San Francisco, Exploratorium
 Santa Barbara: Santa Barbara Museum of Art
 Santa Monica: Santa Monica Museum of Art
 Stanford: Iris & B. Gerald Cantor Center for Visual Arts

Colorado
 Aspen: Aspen Art Museum
 Denver: Anschutz collection, Clyfford Still Museum, Denver Art Museum, Denver Public Library

Connecticut
 Farmington: Hill-Stead Museum
 Hartford: Wadsworth Atheneum
 New Britain: New Britain Museum of American Art
 New Haven: Yale Center for British Art, Yale University Art Gallery
 Old Lyme: Florence Griswold Museum

Delaware
 Dover: Biggs Museum of American Art
 Greenville: Henry Francis du Pont Winterthur Museum
 Wilmington: Delaware Art Museum, Delaware Center for the Contemporary Arts

Florida
 Boca Raton: Boca Raton Museum of Art
 Bradenton: Village of the Arts
 Gainesville: Samuel P. Harn Museum of Art at the University of Florida
 Jacksonville: Museum of Contemporary Art Jacksonville
 Lakeland: Polk Museum of Art
 Miami: Bass Museum, Frost Art Museum, Lowe Art Museum, Pérez Art Museum Miami, Museum of Contemporary Art, Wolfsonian-FIU Museum
 Naples: Naples Museum of Art
 Ocala: Appleton Museum of Art
 Orlando: Orlando Museum of Art
 Sarasota: Ringling Museum of Art
 St. Petersburg: Salvador Dalí Museum
 West Palm Beach: Norton Museum of Art
 Winter Park: Charles Hosmer Morse Museum of American Art

Georgia
 Athens: Georgia Museum of Art
 Atlanta: Michael C. Carlos Museum, High Museum of Art
 Savannah: Telfair Museum of Art

Hawaii
 Honolulu: Hawaii State Art Museum, Honolulu Museum of Art, John Young Museum of Art

Idaho
 Boise: Boise Art Museum
Idaho Falls: Art Museum of Eastern Idaho

Illinois
 Champaign: Krannert Art Museum
 Chicago: Art Institute of Chicago, Museum of Contemporary Art, National Museum of Mexican Art, National Museum of Puerto Rican Arts and Culture, Oriental Institute, National Veterans Art Museum, Smart Museum of Art, Ukrainian Institute of Modern Art
 Evanston: Mary and Leigh Block Museum of Art
 Peoria: Peoria Riverfront Museum
 Springfield: Illinois State Museum

Indiana
Bloomington: Sidney and Lois Eskenazi Museum of Art, Indiana University
Indianapolis: Indianapolis Museum of Art, Eiteljorg Museum of American Indians and Western Art
 Muncie: David Owsley Museum of Art, Ball State University
 Plymouth: Heartland Artists Gallery
 South Bend: Snite Museum of Art
 Terre Haute: Sheldon Swope Art Museum

Iowa
 Davenport: Figge Art Museum
 Des Moines: Des Moines Art Center
 Iowa City: The University of Iowa Museum of Art

Kansas
 Belleville: Boyer Gallery
 Lawrence: Spencer Museum of Art
 Lindsborg: Birger Sandzén Memorial Gallery
 Manhattan: Marianna Kistler Beach Museum of Art
 Overland Park: Nerman Museum of Contemporary Art
 Wichita: Wichita Art Museum

Kentucky
 Louisville: Speed Art Museum
 Owensboro: Owensboro Museum of Fine Art

Louisiana
 Baton Rouge: Shaw Center for the Arts
 New Orleans: Ogden Museum of Southern Art, New Orleans Museum of Art
 Lafayette: Paul and Lulu Hilliard University Art Museum

Maine
 Brunswick: Bowdoin College Museum of Art
 Portland: Portland Museum of Art
 Ogunquit: Ogunquit Museum of American Art
 Rockland: Farnsworth Art Museum, Center for Maine Contemporary Art
 Waterville: Colby College Museum of Art

Maryland
 Baltimore: American Visionary Art Museum, Baltimore Museum of Art, Walters Art Museum

Massachusetts
 Amherst: Mead Art Museum, University Museum of Contemporary Art, Eric Carle Museum of Picture Book Art
 Andover: Addison Gallery of American Art
 Boston: Boston Museum of Fine Arts, Isabella Stewart Gardner Museum, Institute of Contemporary Art, Boston, McMullen Museum of Art, Museum of Bad Art
 Brockton: Fuller Craft Museum
 Cambridge: Harvard Art Museums, List Visual Arts Center, Peabody Museum of Archaeology and Ethnology
 Clinton: Museum of Russian Icons
 Dennis: Cape Cod Museum of Art
 Duxbury: Art Complex Museum
 Fitchburg: Fitchburg Art Museum
 Framingham: Danforth Museum
 Gloucester: Cape Ann Museum
 Harvard: Fruitlands Museum
 Lenox: Frelinghuysen Morris House and Studio
 Lincoln: DeCordova Museum and Sculpture Park
 North Adams: Massachusetts Museum of Contemporary Art
 Northampton: Smith College Museum of Art
 Provincetown: Provincetown Art Association and Museum
 Salem: Peabody Essex Museum
 South Hadley: Mount Holyoke College Art Museum
 Springfield: George Walter Vincent Smith Art Museum, Michele & Donald D’Amour Museum of Fine Arts
 Stockbridge: Chesterwood, Norman Rockwell Museum
 Waltham: Rose Art Museum
 Wellesley: Davis Museum and Cultural Center
 West Stockbridge: Turn Park Art Space
 Williamstown: Clark Art Institute, Williams College Museum of Art
 Worcester: Worcester Art Museum

Michigan
 Ann Arbor: University of Michigan Museum of Art
 Detroit: Detroit Institute of Arts
 Grand Rapids: Grand Rapids Art Museum

Minnesota
 Minneapolis: Minneapolis Institute of Art, Walker Art Center, The Museum of Russian Art

Mississippi
 Jackson: Mississippi Museum of Art
 Biloxi: Ohr-O'Keefe Museum of Art
 Laurel: Lauren Rogers Museum of Art

Missouri
 St. Louis: Saint Louis Art Museum
 Kansas City, Missouri: Nelson-Atkins Museum of Art, Kemper Museum of Contemporary Art

Montana
 Billings: Yellowstone Art Museum
 Helena: Holter Museum of Art
 Missoula: Missoula Art Museum

Nebraska
 Kearney: Museum of Nebraska Art
 Lincoln: Sheldon Museum of Art
 Omaha: Joslyn Art Museum

Nevada

 Reno: 

__

New Jersey
 Glassboro: Heritage Glass Museum
 Jersey City: Mana Contemporary, Museum of Russian Art
 Montclair: Montclair Art Museum
 Newark: Newark Museum of Art
 New Brunswick: Zimmerli Art Museum
 Princeton: Princeton University Art Museum

New Hampshire
 Hanover: Hood Museum of Art
 Manchester: Currier Museum of Art

New Mexico
 Santa Fe: New Mexico Museum of Art, Museum of International Folk Art, SITE Santa Fe; IAIA Museum of Contemporary Native Arts, Museum of Indian Arts and Culture, Georgia O'Keefe Museum, Museum of Spanish Colonial Art
 Taos, New Mexico: Taos Art Museum, Harwood Museum of Art, Millicent Rogers Museum

New York

 Albany: Albany Institute of History & Art
 Beacon: Dia:Beacon
 Buffalo: Albright-Knox Art Gallery
 Canajoharie, New York: Arkell Museum
 Cooperstown: Fenimore Art Museum
 Corning: Corning Museum of Glass, Rockwell Museum
 Elmira: Arnot Art Museum
 Glens Falls: Hyde Collection
 Huntington: Heckscher Museum of Art
 Ithaca: Herbert F. Johnson Museum of Art
 Mountainville: Storm King Art Center
 New York City: Guggenheim, Metropolitan Museum of Art, Museum of Modern Art (MoMA), Whitney Museum of American Art, Brooklyn Museum, Frick Collection, The Morgan Library & Museum, The Cloisters, Dahesh Museum of Art, Asia Society, Neue Galerie New York, Hispanic Society of America, Museum of the City of New York, Cooper-Hewitt Museum, New Museum of Contemporary Art, Rubin Museum of Art, P.S.1 Contemporary Art Center, Jacques Marchais Museum of Tibetan Art, Dia Art Foundation
 Poughkeepsie: Frances Lehman Loeb Art Center
 Rochester: Memorial Art Gallery
 Southampton: Parrish Art Museum
 Syracuse: Everson Museum of Art
 Utica: Munson-Williams-Proctor Arts Institute

North Carolina
 Asheville: Asheville Art Museum, Folk Art Center
 Chapel Hill: Ackland Art Museum
 Charlotte: Bechtler Museum of Modern Art, Mint Museum of Art
 Durham: Nasher Museum of Art
 Greensboro: Weatherspoon Art Museum
 Raleigh: North Carolina Museum of Art, Contemporary Art Museum of Raleigh
 Winston-Salem: Reynolda House Museum of American Art

North Dakota
 Dickinson: Dickinson Museum Center
 Fargo: Plains Art Museum
 Grand Forks: North Dakota Museum of Art
 Minot: Taube Museum of Art

Ohio
 Akron: Akron Art Museum
 Cincinnati: Cincinnati Art Museum, Contemporary Arts Center, Taft Museum of Art
 Cleveland: The Cleveland Museum of Art
 Columbus: Columbus Museum of Art, Wexner Center
 Oberlin: Allen Memorial Art Museum
 Toledo: Toledo Museum of Art
 Youngstown: The Butler Institute of American Art

Oklahoma
 Norman: Fred Jones Jr. Museum of Art
 Oklahoma City: Oklahoma City Museum of Art, National Cowboy & Western Heritage Museum
 Shawnee: Mabee-Gerrer Museum of Art
 Tulsa: Gilcrease Museum, Philbrook Museum of Art, Sherwin Miller Museum of Jewish Art

Oregon
 Eugene: Jordan Schnitzer Museum of Art
 Portland: Portland Art Museum
 Salem: Hallie Ford Museum of Art

Pennsylvania
 Allentown: Allentown Art Museum
 Chadds Ford: Brandywine River Museum
 Greensburg: Westmoreland Museum of American Art
 Philadelphia: Barnes Foundation, Pennsylvania Academy of Fine Arts, Philadelphia Museum of Art, Rodin Museum, University of Pennsylvania Museum of Archaeology and Anthropology
 Pittsburgh: The Andy Warhol Museum, Carnegie Museum of Art, Frick Art & Historical Center, Mattress Factory, Randyland, Toonseum, Trundle Manor

Puerto Rico
 Ponce: Ponce Museum of Art
 San Juan: Museum of Art of Puerto Rico

Rhode Island
 Newport: Newport Art Museum, National Museum of American Illustration
 Providence: Rhode Island School of Design Museum

South Carolina
 Charleston: Gibbes Museum of Art
 Greenville: Bob Jones University Museum and Gallery, Greenville County Museum of Art
 Columbia: Columbia Museum of Art

Tennessee
 Chattanooga: Hunter Museum of American Art
 Knoxville: Knoxville Museum of Art
 Memphis: Art Museum of the University of Memphis, Belz Museum of Asian and Judaic Art, Dixon Gallery and Gardens, Memphis Brooks Museum of Art
 Nashville: Frist Center for the Visual Arts

Texas
 Abilene: The Grace Museum
 Amarillo: Amarillo Museum of Art
 Austin: Austin Museum of Art, Blanton Museum of Art, Elisabet Ney Museum, Harry Ransom Center, Mexic-Arte Museum
 Beaumont: Art Museum of Southeast Texas, Dishman Art Museum
 Corsicana: The Pearce Collections at Navarro College
 Dallas: Crow Collection of Asian Art, Dallas Contemporary, Dallas Museum of Art, Meadows Museum, Museum of Biblical Art, Museum of Geometric and MADI Art
 El Paso: El Paso Museum of Art
 Fort Worth: Amon Carter Museum, Kimbell Art Museum, Modern Art Museum of Fort Worth, Sid Richardson Museum
 Houston: ArtCar Museum, Bayou Bend Collection and Gardens, Blaffer Art Museum, Byzantine Fresco Chapel, Lawndale Art Center, Museum of Fine Arts, Houston, Menil Collection, Rothko Chapel, Station Museum of Contemporary Art
 Irving: Irving Arts Center
 Kerrville: Museum of Western Art
 Marfa: Chinati Foundation
 McAllen: International Museum of Art & Science
 Orange: Stark Museum of Art
 San Antonio: Artpace, Blue Star Contemporary Art Center, McNay Art Museum, San Antonio Museum of Art
 Tyler: Tyler Museum of Art

Utah
 Brigham City: Brigham City Museum of Art & History
 Salt Lake City: Utah Museum of Contemporary Art

Vermont
 Burlington: Robert Hull Fleming Museum
 Middlebury: Middlebury College Museum of Art
 Shelburne: Shelburne Museum

Virginia
 Charlottesville: Fralin Museum of Art
 Norfolk: Chrysler Museum of Art
 Richmond: Virginia Museum of Fine Arts
 Roanoke: Taubman Museum of Art
 Williamsburg: Abby Aldrich Rockefeller Folk Art Museum

Washington (state)
 Seattle: Seattle Art Museum, Seattle Asian Art Museum, Frye Art Museum
 Maryhill, Maryhill Museum of Art

Washington, D.C.: National Gallery of Art, Hirshhorn Museum and Sculpture Garden, National Museum of Women in the Arts, Phillips Collection, Dumbarton Oaks, Smithsonian American Art Museum, US Art Gallery, Corcoran Gallery of Art, National Portrait Gallery, Kreeger Museum, Freer Gallery of Art, Arthur M. Sackler Gallery

West Virginia
 Huntington: Huntington Museum of Art

Wisconsin
 Madison: Chazen Museum of Art, Madison Museum of Contemporary Art
 Milwaukee: Grohmann Museum, Patrick and Beatrice Haggerty Museum of Art, Milwaukee Art Museum, Villa Terrace Decorative Arts Museum
 West Bend: Museum of Wisconsin Art

Wyoming
 Jackson Hole: National Museum of Wildlife Art
 Sheridan County, Wyoming: The Brinton Museum

Oceania
Australia

 Adelaide: Art Gallery of South Australia
 Ballarat: Ballarat Fine Art Gallery
 Brisbane: Queensland Art Gallery; Queensland Gallery of Modern Art
 Canberra: National Gallery of Australia; Canberra Museum and Gallery
 Darwin: Museum and Art Gallery of the Northern Territory
 Geelong: Geelong Art Gallery
 Hobart: Museum of Old and New Art; Tasmanian Museum and Art Gallery
 Melbourne: National Gallery of Victoria; Ian Potter Centre; Ian Potter Museum of Art (University of Melbourne)
 Perth: Art Gallery of Western Australia
 Rockhampton: Rockhampton Museum of Art
 Sydney: Art Gallery of New South Wales; Museum of Contemporary Art

New Zealand
 Auckland: Auckland Art Gallery
 Christchurch: Christchurch Art Gallery
 Dunedin: Dunedin Public Art Gallery
 Mangaweka : Permanent display of New Zealand's most famed forger C.F. Goldie (also known as Karl Sim)
 Wellington: Museum of New Zealand Te Papa Tongarewa; National Art Gallery of New Zealand (now part of Te Papa)

South America

Argentina
 Buenos Aires: Museo Nacional de Bellas Artes, Buenos Aires Museum of Modern Art (MAMBA), Latin American Art Museum of Buenos Aires (MALBA), National Museum of Decorative Arts, Ernesto de la Cárcova Museum of Reproductions and Comparative Sculpture, Fortabat Art Collection, Museo de Arte Español Enrique Larreta, Museo de Arte Hispanoamericano Isaac Fernández Blanco, Tigre Club
 Córdoba: Caraffa Fine Arts Museum, Evita Fine Arts Museum
 Junín: Ángel María de Rosa Municipal Museum of Art
 Mar del Plata: Juan Carlos Castagnino Municipal Museum of Art
 Rosario: Firma y Odilo Estévez Municipal Decorative Art Museum, Juan B. Castagnino Fine Arts Museum, Museum of Contemporary Art of Rosario
 San Miguel de Tucumán: Timoteo Navarro Museum of Art

Brazil
 Niterói: Niterói Contemporary Art Museum
 Porto Alegre: Rio Grande do Sul Museum of Art
 Ribeirão Preto: Museu de Arte de Ribeirão Preto
 Rio de Janeiro: Museu Nacional de Belas Artes, Museum of Modern Art Rio de Janeiro(MAM)
 Santa Catarina: Santa Catarina Art Museum
 São Paulo: São Paulo Museum of Art, São Paulo Museum of Modern Art (MAM), Museum of Contemporary Art, University of São Paulo

Chile
 Santiago de Chile: Museo Nacional de Bellas Artes, Santiago Museum of Contemporary Art (MAC)

Colombia
 Bogotá: Bogotá Museum of Modern Art (MAMBO), Botero Museum, Colonial Art Museum of Bogotá, Colombian National Museum, Gold Museum, Museum of Contemporary Art of Bogotá, Miguel Urrutia Art Museum
 Cali: La Tertulia Museum
 Medellín: El Castillo Museum, Museum of Antioquia, Medellín Museum of Modern Art (MAMM)
 Ibagué: Museo de Arte del Tolima

Peru
 Lima: Museo de Arte de Lima

See also
 List of most visited art museums
 List of largest art museums
 List of sculpture parks
 List of single-artist museums

References

List
Articles containing video clips